The men's giant slalom at the 1956 Winter Olympics was held on 29 January on Mount Faloria, outside Cortina d'Ampezzo, Italy. There were 71 gates for the men to navigate on the course. Ninety-five men from twenty-nine countries entered the race though eight were disqualified. Austrian men swept the medals.

Source:

Results
Sunday, 29 January 1956

Source:

See also

 1956 Winter Olympics

Notes

References
 

Men's alpine skiing at the 1956 Winter Olympics